Teslya or Teslia is a  Ukrainian-language surname literally meaning the occupation of  "carpenter", "cabinetmaker", "joiner" Notable people with this surname include:

Sergey Teslya
Viktor Teslia

See also
Tesla (surname)

Ukrainian-language surnames
Occupational surnames
Patronymic surnames